Second Sight is a studio album by jazz acoustic bassist Marc Johnson, recorded under the group name Marc Johnson's Bass Desires. Prominently featuring the writing and playing of two of the most popular jazz guitarists of the day, Bill Frisell and John Scofield, and former Weather Report drummer Peter Erskine. It was released on the ECM label in 1987.

Reception
The Allmusic review by Scott Yanow awarded the album 4 stars, stating, "This advanced unit performs eight group originals that cover a wide variety of moods, from introspective, spacy pieces to ones emphasizing fire and passion".

Track listing
All compositions by Marc Johnson except as indicated
 "Crossing the Corpus Callosum" - 8:30 
 "Small Hands" (Bill Frisell) - 6:44 
 "Sweet Soul" (Peter Erskine) - 7:31 
 "Twister" (John Scofield) - 4:57 
 "Thrill Seekers" (Scofield) - 8:38 
 "Prayer Beads" - 3:57 
 "1951" (Frisell) - 5:07 
 "Hymn for Her" - 6:38 
Recorded at Rainbow Studio in Oslo, Norway in March 1987

Personnel
Marc Johnson – bass
Bill Frisell – guitar
John Scofield – guitar
Peter Erskine – drums

References 

1987 albums
ECM Records albums
Marc Johnson (musician) albums
Albums produced by Manfred Eicher